Prolation is a term used in the theory of the mensural notation of medieval and Renaissance music to describe its rhythmic structure on a small scale, as opposed to tempus, which described a larger scale. The term "prolation" is derived from the Latin prolatio ("enlargement"/"prolongation"), first used by Philippe de Vitry in describing Ars Nova, a musical style that came about in 14th-century France.

Prolation, together with tempus, corresponds roughly to the concept of time signature in modern music. Prolation describes whether a semibreve (whole note) is equal in length to two minims (half notes) (minor prolation or imperfect prolation; in Latin "prolatio minor") or, like a tuplet, three minims (major prolation or perfect prolation; in Latin "prolatio maior"). Tempus similarly describes the relationship between the breve and semibreve. These may be compared to the additive rhythm and divisive rhythm, rhythmic divisions and rhythmic groupings which define time signatures.

Early medieval music was often structured in subdivisions of three, while the note values in modern music are most often subdivided into two parts, 4/4 being the most common time signature, meaning that minor prolation has primarily survived in our time signature system, while major prolation has been replaced by notation modifying note values with dots or triplets. The history of written medieval music shows a gradual shift from major to minor prolation being common.

The equivalent term in the Italian notation of the fourteenth century is "divisio", which covers both tempus and prolation.  Italian divisiones, first described by Marchetto da Padova, can also allow four minims within a semibreve. For instance octonaria and duodenaria place eight and twelve minims in a breve respectively divided into two or three "major" semibreves.

Further reading

Musical notation
Medieval music theory